Oto is a city in Woodbury County, Iowa, United States.  It is part of the Sioux City, IA–NE–SD Metropolitan Statistical Area. The population was 72 at the time of the 2020 census.

Geography
Oto is located at  (42.283676, -95.894047). It is situated near the Little Sioux River.

Demographics

2010 census
As of the census of 2010, there were 108 people, 46 households, and 27 families living in the city. The racial makeup of the city was 96.3% White, 0.9% Native American, 0.9% Asian, 0.9% from other races, and 0.9% from two or more races. Hispanic or Latino of any race were 9.3% of the population.

There were 46 households, of which 28.3% had children under the age of 18 living with them, 39.1% were married couples living together, 15.2% had a female householder with no husband present, 4.3% had a male householder with no wife present, and 41.3% were non-families. 39.1% of all households were made up of individuals, and 26.1% had someone living alone who was 65 years of age or older. The average household size was 2.35 and the average family size was 3.07.

The median age in the city was 38.5 years. 22.2% of residents were under the age of 18; 8.3% were between the ages of 18 and 24; 25.9% were from 25 to 44; 26.9% were from 45 to 64; and 16.7% were 65 years of age or older. The gender makeup of the city was 50.9% male and 49.1% female.

2000 census
As of the census of 2000, there were 145 people, 54 households, and 40 families living in the city. The racial makeup of the city was 96.55% White, 2.76% Native American, and 0.69% from two or more races. Hispanic or Latino of any race were 0.69% of the population.

There were 54 households, out of which 29.6% had children under the age of 18 living with them, 50.0% were married couples living together, 14.8% had a female householder with no husband present, and 25.9% were non-families. 24.1% of all households were made up of individuals, and 14.8% had someone living alone who was 65 years of age or older. The average household size was 2.69 and the average family size was 3.05.

In the city, the population was spread out, with 29.7% under the age of 18, 6.2% from 18 to 24, 35.9% from 25 to 44, 14.5% from 45 to 64, and 13.8% who were 65 years of age or older. The median age was 34 years. For every 100 females, there were 101.4 males. For every 100 females age 18 and over, there were 96.2 males.

The median income for a household in the city was $22,857, and the median income for a family was $24,500. Males had a median income of $21,500 versus $16,563 for females. The per capita income for the city was $9,237. There were 11.1% of families and 21.3% of the population living below the poverty line, including 23.6% of under eighteens and none of those over 64.

Education
The city is served by the Maple Valley–Anthon–Oto Community School District.

The Oto and Anthon school districts consolidated in 1959 to form the Anthon–Oto Community School District. The Anthon–Oto district began grade-sharing with the Maple Valley Community School District circa 1993, and as part of that arrangement all high school students from both districts attended high school in Mapleton. On July 1, 2012, Anthon–Oto merged with Maple Valley to form the Maple Valley–Anthon–Oto district.

References

Cities in Iowa
Cities in Woodbury County, Iowa
Sioux City metropolitan area